Francesco Ginanni (born 6 October 1985 in Pistoia) is an Italian professional road bicycle racer for UCI Professional Continental team , after turning professional with  in 2008. As an amateur, Ginanni won five races in 2006 and four races in 2007, including the Giro del Casentino, a 1.2 rated single-day race on the UCI Europe Tour. Ginanni's first professional victory came in the Gran Premio Industria e Commercio Artigianato Carnaghese in August 2008, which he followed up by winning the Tre Valli Varesine and Giro del Veneto, both races classified as 1.HC – the highest rating for single-day races on the UCI Europe Tour. The Daily Peloton called 2008 "a real breakthrough year" for Ginanni. Ginanni won a further three single-day races in 2009 and, as of March 2010, one in 2010. Ginanni won the Trofeo Laigueglia in both 2009 and 2010, emulating Eddy Merckx and Filippo Pozzato. Ginanni is aiming to win Milan–San Remo, one of the five monuments of road bicycle racing. In the 2010 edition, he finished 7th.

Palmarès

References

External links 

Italian male cyclists
People from Pistoia
1985 births
Living people
Sportspeople from the Province of Pistoia
Cyclists from Tuscany